(Hail Mary), WAB 6, is a sacred motet by Anton Bruckner, a setting of the Latin prayer Ave Maria. He composed it in Linz in 1861 and scored the short work in F major for seven unaccompanied voices. The piece, sometimes named an Offertorium, was published in Vienna in 1867. Before, Bruckner composed the same prayer in 1856 for soprano, alto, a four-part mixed choir, organ and cello, WAB 5. Later, he set the text in 1882 for a solo voice (alto) and keyboard (organ, piano or harmonium), WAB 7.

History 

Bruckner composed the motet, also known as Ave Maria II, in 1861. He did this after completing five years of studies with Simon Sechter. The motet was first performed on 12 May 1861 as Offertorium of a mass in the Linz Cathedral (now the Old Cathedral). Bruckner was their organist and was also from 1860 director of the Liedertafel (choral society) "Frohsinn" who performed the motet to celebrate the anniversary of its founding. Bruckner wrote in a letter about the reception in a letter dated 3 October 1861: "I was, in the end, splendidly applauded by my choir—twice."

The manuscript is lost, but copies are found in the archive of the Österreichische Nationalbibliothek and the Abbey of Sankt Florian. The piece, sometimes named an Offertorium, was published together with Tota pulchra es by Emil Wetzler in Vienna in 1867.

Music 

Bruckner set the prayer in F major and scored it for seven unaccompanied voices SAATTBB. It takes about 4 minutes to perform. The first section of the 51-bar long Ave Maria  is based on the Annunciation, the greeting of Gabriel the Archangel to Mary and on the Visitation, when Elisabeth paraphrased the greeting. The upper voices begin, while (bar 10) the lower voices respond with "et benedictus ...". All voices united proclaim the name "Jesus" three times in growing intensity (bars 15-20). The second part is for all voices. It begins in canon on "Sancta Maria", and evolves diminuendo with a point d'orgue on bar 30 ("ora pro nobis"), when Mary is asked to "pray for us sinners". Bruckner applies his understanding of older styles to express his personal faith with simplicity but "Romantic sensibility of expression".

James Liu notes about Bruckner's motets in general:

Selected discography 
The first recording of Bruckner's Ave Maria occurred in the early 1920s: 
 Pius Kalt, Choir of the St. Hedwig's Cathedral, 78 rpm: Grammophon J 25010, before 1925

A selection among the about 150 commercial recordings:
 John Alldis, John Alldis Choir, Bruckner, Messiaen, Debussy, Schönberg – LP: Argo ZRG 523, 1967
 Eric Ericson, Schwedischer Rundfunkchor, Treasures – CD: Caprice Records CAP 21814, 1975
 Hans Zanotelli, Philharmonia vocal-ensemble Stuttgart, Anton Bruckner, Lateinische Motetten – CD: Calig CAL 50 477, 1979
 Matthew Best, Corydon Singers, Bruckner: Motets - CD: Hyperion CDA66062, 1982
 Philippe Herreweghe, la Chapelle Royale/Collegium Vocale, Ensemble Musique Oblique, Bruckner: Messe en mi mineur; Motets - CD: Harmonia Mundi France HMC 901322, 1989
 John Rutter, The Cambridge Singers, The Cambridge Singers Collection – CD: Collegium CSCD501, 1991
 Uwe Gronostay, Netherlands Chamber Choir, Bruckner/Reger – CD: Globe GLO 5160, 1995
 Winfried Toll, Frankfurter Kantorei, Der Himmel lacht, die Erde jauchzt – CD: Peters Musikverlag, 2002
 Dan-Olof Stenlund, Malmö Kammarkör, Bruckner: Ausgewählte Werke - CD: Malmö Kammarkör MKKCD 051, 2004
 Peter Dijkstra, Chor des Bayerischen Rundfunks, Machet die Tore weit – CD: Oehms Classics OC 535, 2005
 Petr Fiala, Tschechischer Philharmonischer Chor Brno, Anton Bruckner: Motets - CD: MDG 322 1422-2, 2006
 Michael Stenov, Cantores Carmeli, Benefizkonzert Karmelitenkirche Linz - CD/DVD issued by the choir, 2006, and on YouTube.
 Erwin Ortner, Arnold Schoenberg Chor, Anton Bruckner: Tantum ergo - CD: ASC Edition 3, issue of the choir, 2008
 Tone Bianca Sparre Dahl, Schola Cantorum (Norway), Hymn to the Virgin – CD: Lindberg Lyd 2L-095, 2011
 Otto Kargl, Domkantorei St. Pölten, Cappela Nova Graz, Bruckner: Messe E-Moll, CD: ORF CD 3174, 2013
 Philipp Ahmann, MDR Rundfunkchor Leipzig, Anton Bruckner & Michael Haydn - Motets – SACD: Pentatone PTC 5186 868, 2021

References

Sources 
 Max Auer, Anton Bruckner als Kirchenmusiker, G. Bosse, Regensburg, 1927
 Anton Bruckner - Sämtliche Werke, Band XXI: Kleine Kirchenmusikwerke, Musikwissenschaftlicher Verlag der Internationalen Bruckner-Gesellschaft, Hans Bauernfeind and Leopold Nowak (Editor), Vienna, 1984/2001
 Cornelis van Zwol, Anton Bruckner 1824-1896 - Leven en werken, uitg. Thoth, Bussum, Netherlands, 2012. 
 Uwe Harten, Anton Bruckner. Ein Handbuch. , Salzburg, 1996.

External links 
 
 
 Ave Maria F-Dur, WAB 6 (1861) Critical discography by Hans Roelofs 
 A live performance by Johannes Kleinjung with the Universitätschor, München (2012) can be heard on YouTube: Ave Maria, WAB 6
 

1861 compositions
Motets by Anton Bruckner
Compositions in F major
Marian hymns